Kobasicijada is an international sausage festival organized annually in the village of Turija, near Srbobran, Serbia. 32 festivals had been held as of February, 2017; it is one of the biggest and most popular village festivals in Serbia. The festival is attended by tens of thousands of people every year.

Further reading 
Đisalov, Bogdanka. Tamo-amo po Turinskoj Kobasicijadi. 2006

References

External links 
 

Food and drink festivals in Serbia
Serbian culture
Culture of Vojvodina
Serbian sausages
Annual events in Serbia